Joint Operations Command may refer to:

 Canadian Joint Operations Command
 Joint Operations Command (Australia)
 Joint Operations Command (Serbia)
 Joint Operations Command (Sri Lanka)
 Joint Operations Command (Zimbabwe)

See also
Joint Forces Command (UK)
Joint Special Operations Command (US)
United States Joint Forces Command
Joint Special Operations Command (Jordan)
Permanent Joint Headquarters (UK)

Military units and formations disambiguation pages